Theta Coronae Borealis, Latinized from θ Coronae Borealis, is a binary star system in the constellation Corona Borealis. It shines with a combined apparent visual magnitude (V band) of 4.13. There are two components: Theta Coronae Borealis A with an apparent magnitude of about 4.2, while Theta Coronae Borealis B lies around 1 arcsecond distant and has an apparent magnitude of 6.29. The system is located around 375 light-years from Earth, as estimated from its parallax of 8.69 milliarcseconds. It is estimated to be 85 million years old, with the primary star expected to remain on the main sequence burning its core hydrogen for another 75 million years and the secondary around 500 million years. Both stars will cool and expand once their core hydrogen is exhausted, becoming red giants.

The brighter component, Theta Coronae Borealis A, is a blue-white star that spins extremely rapidly—at a rate of around 393 km per second. This rapid spinning is thought to be the cause of a gaseous disk that surrounds the star: such stars are known as Be shell stars, recognizable because the gas radiates emission lines that give a characteristic pattern in the star's spectrum. Of spectral type B6Vnn, Theta Coronae Borealis A is around six times as massive as the Sun and has four times the diameter. It has a surface temperature of around 14910 K. In 1970, it faded by 0.7 magnitude, becoming 50% fainter. The cause for this is unknown, but thought possibly due to ejection of dust that obscured the star's light.

Theta Coronae Borealis B is a white main sequence star of spectral type A2V that is around 2.5 times as massive as the Sun and located 86 astronomical units from the primary star, the two stars taking an estimated 300 years to orbit around a common centre of gravity.

References

Corona Borealis
B-type main-sequence stars
Binary stars
Be stars
Shell stars
Coronae Borealis, Theta
Coronae Borealis, 04
Durchmusterung objects
5778
076127
138749